Jones County is a county in the U.S. state of South Dakota. As of the 2020 census, the population was 917, making it the least populous county in South Dakota. Its county seat is Murdo. Created in 1916 and organized in 1917, it is the most recently established county in South Dakota.

It was named after Granville Whittington Jones, an Arkansas-born clergyman/lawyer, who moved to Chamberlain, SD and became a noted Chautauqua speaker.

Geography
The terrain of Jones County consists of semi-arid rolling hills, partially devoted to agriculture. The Bad River flows north easterly through the northwest corner of the county, and the White River forms the county's southern boundary. The southern areas of the county are carved with gullies and drainages flowing to the White River. The terrain generally slopes to the northeast, and its highest point is on the lower western boundary, at 2,444' (745m) ASL.

The eastern portion of South Dakota's counties (48 of 66) observe Central Time; the western counties (18 of 66) observe Mountain Time. Jones County is the westernmost of the SD counties to observe Central Time.

Major highways
 Interstate 90
 U.S. Highway 83

Adjacent counties

 Stanley County - north
 Lyman County - east
 Mellette County - south
 Jackson County - southwest (observes Mountain Time)
 Haakon County - northwest (observes Mountain Time)

Protected area
 Buxcel State Game Production Area
Fort Pierre National Grassland (part)

Lakes
 Sheriff Reservoir

Demographics

2000 census
As of the 2000 census, there were 1,485 people, 694 households, and 327 families in the county. The population density was 1.2 people per square mile (0.5/km2). There were 614 housing units at an average density of 0.6 per square mile (0.2/km2). The racial makeup of the county was 56.81% White, 22.43% Native American, 0.08% Pacific Islander, 0.17% from other races, and 1.51% from two or more races. 0.34% of the population were Hispanic or Latino of any race.

There were 694 households, out of which 30.30% had children under the age of 36 living with them, 53.20% were married couples living together, 7.50% had a female householder with no husband present, and 35.60% were non-families. 33.20% of all households were made up of individuals, and 15.10% had someone living alone who was 65 years of age or older. The average household size was 2.34 and the average family size was 2.98.

This county contained 26.20% under the age of 18, 6.20% from 18 to 24, 25.50% from 25 to 44, 23.90% from 45 to 64, and 18.20% who were 65 years of age or older. The median age was 41 years. For every 100 females there were 103.90 males. For every 100 females age 18 and over, there were 102.80 males.

The median income for a household in the county was $30,288, and the median income for a family was $37,500. Males had a median income of $23,289 versus $17,143 for females. The per capita income for the county was $15,896. About 11.90% of families and 15.80% of the population were below the poverty line, including 27.60% of those under age 18 and 7.10% of those age 65 or over.

2010 census
As of the 2010 census, there were 1,006 people, 458 households, and 280 families in the county. The racial makeup of the county was 95.6% white, 2.0% American Indian, 0.4% Pacific islander, 0.1% black or African American, 0.0% from other races, and 1.9% from two or more races. Those of Hispanic or Latino origin made up 1.3% of the population. In terms of ancestry, 48.8% were German, 15.9% were Irish, 10.2% were Norwegian, 9.0% were Dutch, and 1.9% were American.
In terms of ancestry in 2016, 39.1% were of German, 14.3% were of Irish, 13.9% were of Norwegian, 11.4% were of Dutch, 6.4% were of English, 6.2 were of French.

Of the 458 households, 26.6% had children under the age of 18 living with them, 53.7% were married couples living together, 5.2% had a female householder with no husband present, 38.9% were non-families, and 35.8% of all households were made up of individuals. The average household size was 2.20 and the average family size was 2.86. The median age was 46.9 years.

The median income for a household in the county was $49,464 and the median income for a family was $56,589. Males had a median income of $33,021 versus $27,115 for females. The per capita income for the county was $24,630. About 6.6% of families and 9.1% of the population were below the poverty line, including 16.7% of those under age 18 and 8.4% of those age 65 or over.

Communities

City
 Murdo (county seat)

Town
 Draper

Census-designated place
 Okaton

Unincorporated community
Capa

Townships

Buffalo
Draper
Dunkel
Grandview
Kolls
Morga
Mullen
Mussman
Okaton
Scovil
South Creek
Williams Creek
Zickrick

Unorganized territories

Central Jones
North Jones
Rich Valley
Westover

Politics
Jones County voters have been reliably Republican. The last Democrat to carry Jones County in a Presidential election was Lyndon Johnson in 1964, and Jimmy Carter in 1976 was the last to top one third of the county's ballots. Even before the Democratic Party turned towards its modern liberalism, Jones County did not vote for any Democrat except LBJ and Franklin D. Roosevelt in 1932 and 1936 – and in the latter election when Roosevelt won 46 of 48 states he beat Alf Landon in Jones County by just twelve votes.

See also
 National Register of Historic Places listings in Jones County, South Dakota

References

 
1917 establishments in South Dakota
Populated places established in 1917